The 2006 ARFU Asian Rugby Series was the third edition of a tournament created by Asian Rugby Football Union for national teams.

First and second division were also valid as second round of Asian qualification for 2007 Rugby World cup

Tournaments

First Division  

{| class="wikitable"
|-
!width=30|Pos.
!width=100|Team
!width=30|P
!width=30|W
!width=30|D
!width=30|Lost
!width=30|For
!width=30|Ag.
!width=40|Diff.
!width=30|Points
!width=300|Notes
|-
|- bgcolor=#ccffcc align=center
|1||align=left|||2||2||0||0||132||23||+109||4|| Qualified to the final round of RWC Qualification) 
|- bgcolor=#ffffff align=center
|2||align=left|||2||1||0||1||34||55||-21||2|| Qualified to the final round of RWC Qualification) 
|- bgcolor=#ffffCC align=center
|3||align=left|Arabian Gulf||2||0||0||2||14||102||-88||0||   relegated to next year's division 2
|}

Second division  
{| class="wikitable"
|-
!width=30|Pos.
!width=100|Team
!width=30|P
!width=30|W
!width=30|D
!width=30|Lost
!width=30|For
!width=30|Ag.
!width=40|Diff.
!width=30|Points
!width=300|Notes
|-
|- bgcolor=#ccffcc align=center
|1||align=left|||2||2||0||0||65||21||+44||4|| promoted and Qualified to the final round of RWC Qualif.) 
|- bgcolor=#ffffff align=center
|2||align=left|||2||1||0||1||44||42||+2||2||
|- bgcolor=#ffffCC align=center
|3||align=left|||2||0||0||2||7||53||-46||0||  relegated to next year's division 3
|}

Third division 
{| class="wikitable"
|-
!width=30|Pos.
!width=100|Team
!width=30|P
!width=30|W
!width=30|D
!width=30|Lost
!width=30|For
!width=30|Ag.
!width=40|Diff.
!width=30|Points
!width=300|Notes
|-
|- bgcolor=#ccffcc align=center
|1||align=left|||2||2||0||0||47||20||+27||4|| promoted to next year's division 2
|- bgcolor=#ffffff align=center
|2||align=left|||2||1||0||1||34||51||-17||2||
|- bgcolor=#ffffCC align=center
|3||align=left|||2||0||0||2||42||52||-10||0||  relegated to next year's division 4 
|}

Fourth Division 
{| class="wikitable"
|-
!width=30|Pos.
!width=100|Team
!width=30|P
!width=30|W
!width=30|D
!width=30|Lost
!width=30|For
!width=30|Ag.
!width=40|Diff.
!width=30|Points
!width=300|Notes
|-
|- bgcolor=#ccffcc align=center
|1||align=left|||2||2||0||0||98||46||+52||4|| promoted to next year's division 3
|- bgcolor=#ffffff align=center
|2||align=left|||2||1||0||1||76||65||+11||2||
|- bgcolor=#ffffCC align=center
|3||align=left|||2||0||0||2||48||111||-63||0||  relegated to next year's division 5 
|}

Fifth Division 
{| class="wikitable"
|-
!width=30|Pos.
!width=100|Team
!width=30|P
!width=30|W
!width=30|D
!width=30|Lost
!width=30|For
!width=30|Ag.
!width=40|Diff.
!width=30|Points
!width=300|Notes
|-
|- bgcolor=#ccffcc align=center
|1||align=left|||2||2||0||0||51||25||+26||4|| promoted to next year's division 4
|- bgcolor=#ffffff align=center
|2||align=left|||2||1||0||1||21||38||-17||2||
|- bgcolor=#ffffff align=center
|3||align=left|||2||0||0||2||36||49||-9||0||
|}

Regional tournament 
{| class="wikitable"
|-
!width=30|Pos.
!width=100|Team
!width=30|P
!width=30|W
!width=30|D
!width=30|Lost
!width=30|For
!width=30|Ag.
!width=40|Diff.
!width=30|Points
!width=300|Notes
|-
|- bgcolor=#ccffcc align=center
|1||align=left|||3||3||0||0||101||17||+84||6||
|- bgcolor=#ffffff align=center
|2||align=left|||3||2||0||1||73||60||+13||4||
|- bgcolor=#ffffff align=center
|3||align=left|||3||1||0||2||62||90||-28||2||
|- bgcolor=#ffffff align=center
|4||align=left|||3||0||0||3||27||96||-69||0||
|}

2006
2006 rugby union tournaments for national teams
2006 in Asian rugby union